The Pleasant Hill United Church of Christ is a historic church in the village of Pleasant Hill in the western part of the U.S. state of Ohio.  Built in the early twentieth century, it was the fourth building used as the home of one of the area's oldest congregations, and it has been named a historic site.

Founded in 1843, Pleasant Hill was originally called "Newton" in honor of Sir Isaac, after whom the surrounding township was also named.  By the time it was incorporated in 1866, it had changed its name to "Pleasant Hill"; the establishment of a post office in the community led locals to wonder if their mail would be mis-sent, so a new name was chosen.  The area's first residents were Quakers; they organized in 1813 and built their first church building in 1820.  A group of Christian Connexion-affiliated people founded a church two years after the Quakers; it took the name of "Hopewell" following a naming discussion at the original meeting, during which one of the charter members said she "hoped the church might do well".  The earliest structure, a log building, was built in 1820 out of town, but it was later removed and replaced by a frame structure on the same site.  It in turn was replaced by a brick building in Pleasant Hill; according to a congregation historian, this change was the result of an 1868 storm that virtually destroyed the old building.  This structure served the congregation for slightly more than forty years; following the worship service of 10 April 1910, it was taken down to facilitate the construction of the present building on the same site.  During the 20th century, the congregation became a part of the United Church of Christ, within which it remains.

The church is a Gothic Revival structure built with an Akron Plan interior.  It appears to be built of brick, but the structure actually relies on limestone for its foundation and walls, with a roof of ceramic tile and occasional elements of wood.  Located on a corner lot, the building features a tower on the corner facing the intersection; worshippers can enter by climbing a small flight of stairs to the base of the tower.  Large gabled sections with fat ogee-arched windows face both streets, with a functional addition to the rear.

In late 2002, the Pleasant Hill UCC was listed on the National Register of Historic Places.  One of more than forty such locations in Miami County and the only one in the village of Pleasant Hill, it qualified for listing because of its historically significant architecture.

References

External links
Church website

Churches completed in 1911
Churches in Miami County, Ohio
Gothic Revival church buildings in Ohio
National Register of Historic Places in Miami County, Ohio
United Church of Christ churches in Ohio